In mathematics, constant curvature is a concept from differential geometry. Here, curvature refers to the sectional curvature of a space (more precisely a manifold) and is a single number determining its local geometry. The sectional curvature is said to be constant if it has the same value at every point and for every two-dimensional tangent plane at that point. For example, a sphere is a surface of constant positive curvature.

Classification
The Riemannian manifolds of constant curvature can be classified into the following three cases:

 elliptic geometry – constant positive sectional curvature
 Euclidean geometry – constant vanishing sectional curvature
 hyperbolic geometry – constant negative sectional curvature.

Properties
 Every space of constant curvature is locally symmetric, i.e. its curvature tensor is parallel .
 Every space of constant curvature is locally maximally symmetric, i.e. it has  number of local isometries, where  is its dimension.
 Conversely, there exists a similar but stronger statement: every maximally symmetric space, i.e. a space which has  (global) isometries, has constant curvature.
 (Killing–Hopf theorem) The universal cover of a manifold of constant sectional curvature is one of the model spaces:
 sphere (sectional curvature positive)
 plane (sectional curvature zero)
 hyperbolic manifold (sectional curvature negative)
 A space of constant curvature which is geodesically complete is called space form and the study of space forms is intimately related to generalized crystallography (see the article on space form for more details).
 Two space forms are isomorphic if and only if they have the same dimension, their metrics possess the same signature and their sectional curvatures are equal.

References
 Moritz Epple (2003) From Quaternions to Cosmology: Spaces  of Constant Curvature ca. 1873 — 1925, invited address to International Congress of Mathematicians
 

Differential geometry of surfaces
Riemannian geometry
Curvature (mathematics)